Suzanne Tassier-Charlier (June 4, 1898 - March 12, 1956) was a Belgian historian, political activist, feminist, and Professeur ordinaire. She was the first Belgian woman to be awarded a higher education degree in her country.

Biography
Suzanne Tassier was born in Antwerp on June 4, 1898. Her father was Major General Emile Tassier. She began her studies at the École normale de Bruxelles. World War I forced her to continue and complete her secondary education abroad, first in the Isle of Wight in the United Kingdom, then in Versailles, Yvelines, France. Back in Belgium after the war, she entered the Université libre de Bruxelles (ULB) in 1919 where she studied History.

Career

From then on, she was a lecturer at the ULB. 

The same year, she married Gustave Charlier (1885-1959), professor of philology at the same institution. 

Her feminist convictions were reinforced following a trip to the United States that she made with her husband in 1938. During this trip, Tassier discovered the Hoover Institution Library and Archives, dedicated to the study of World War I and the Russian Revolution of 1917.

In 1940 and 1941, following the eviction of professors Frans van Kalken and Michel Huisman at ULB by the Nazi occupiers, Tassier took over some of their courses. In 1945, Michel Huisman having left his position, she took over most of his teaching, as well as some other courses, and officially became a professeur ordinaire at ULB in 1948.

Publications
Tassier published numerous books and articles throughout her career. Before World War II, her three major books on the Brabant Revolution, its premises and its aftermath were published, beginning with her thesis of 1923, . , a 1929 dissertation that was awarded and published in 1930 by the Royal Academy of Science, Letters and Fine Arts of Belgium, and then her 1934 agrégation thesis, .

While after World War II, her work was published in a number of journals and collective works, her important publications became rarer. There was another compilation work in 1944, which reprinted articles that had appeared before the war, a reworked part of her 1934 dissertation, and the introductory lesson of her course ; the same year, for a world war museum and an office of contemporary documentation; in 1951, ; as well as a variety of other articles and contributions up to 1954. At the end of her life, she turned her interests towards the sixteenth century and had already announced in 1951 the publication of the book , a work that her premature death did not allow her to realize.

Death and legacy
During the 1950s, Tassier's health deteriorated, and she died on March 12, 1956, in Schaerbeek, at the age of 58. Her legacy is honored by the Suzanne Tassier-Charlier Chair at ULB, since 1963.

Selected works
 Les démocrates belges de 1789 : Étude sur le Vonckisme et la révolution brabançonne, 1929
 Histoire de la Belgique sous l'occupation franc̜aise en 1792 et 1793, 1934
 Un grand centre historique américain : la Hoover Library, 1940
 Figures révolutionnaíres, XVIII siècle, 1942 
 Idées et profils du XVIIIe siècle, 1944
 L'histoire de la guerre mondiale : pour un Musée de la guerre mondiale et un Office de documentation contemporaine, 1944
 La technique des révolutions nationales et le duel Cornet de Grez - Verlooy : une cause inconnue de la première coalition, 1947 
 La Belgique et l'entrée en guerre des États-Unis, 1914-1917, 1950
 Figures révolutionnaíres, XVIII siècle, 1954
 Aux origines de la Première coalition : le ministre Le Brun Tondu : par Suzanne Tassier, 1954
 La Jeunesse de l'historien Michel Huisman, par Suzanne Tassier, 1954

References

Bibliography 
 Dictionnaire des femmes belges. XIX et XX siècles (DFB), Éliane Gubin (dir), Éditions Racine, Bruxelles, 2006, pp. 523-524. 
 Inventaire détaillé des archives de la famille Tassier (IDAFT), Archives générales du Royaume, 1994. 
 Revue belge de philologie et d'histoire (RBPH), Année 1956, Volume 34, Numéro 34-3, "Nécrologie de Suzanne Tassier-Charlier" par Maurice-Aurélien Arnould, pp. 964-967. 

1898 births
1956 deaths
People from Antwerp
20th-century Belgian historians
20th-century Belgian non-fiction writers
20th-century Belgian women writers
Université libre de Bruxelles alumni
Belgian academics
Political activists
Belgian feminists